Eastwind was a music festival held in 2008 which was planned to be held annually in India garnering participation from all the major bands and artists in the country. The criterion was Original Contemporary Music and artists performed over three days and through parallel stages from morning till night.

The festival
The recent years (since 2000) have seen increased recognition, visibility and surge in popularity of contemporary original music in India. In spite of that, the world’s perception of Indian music is still subjected to stereotypes, typically Bollywood.

New Delhi plays host to a large number of the nation’s most popular live acts. With Indian bands and their music getting popular and bands being invited to perform abroad, Eastwind creates a single-point showcase that recognises and presents this talent as an entertainment experience.

The idea of a large-scale music festival in India was pathbreaking and the participation of the most popular bands in the country was the main crowd-pulling element of the festival. Prospect Advisory & Management, who visualized and created this festival, were so swamped with requests for participation that they even had to postpone the first event in order to get through all the demos and applications. 

The second edition was postponed from October 2009 to January 2010 before being cancelled.

Performing artists 
Leni Stern
Karsh Kale
Skinny Alley
Dhruv Ghanekar and the Ranjit Barot Project
PINKNOISE
Thermal and a Quarter
Shaa’ir + Func
Pentagram
Avial
Chromozome Eye
Them Clones
Jalebee Cartel
Parikrama
Helga's Fun Castle
Groove Suppa
Indian Ocean
Bandish
East India Company
Hypnosis
Evergreen
Baja Gaja
Oidua
Boomarang
III Sovereign
Mrigya
Sattyanada
Raghu Dixit Project
Junkyard Groove
Midival Punditz
Levitikus
Barefaced Liar
Blend
Dream Out Loud
Cassini’s Division
Span
Five Little Indians
Anal Funk
Little Babooshka’s Grind
HFT
Half Step Down
Myndsnare
Menwhopause
Kryptos
Soulmate
Galeej Gurus
Artistes Unlimited
Feedback
Medusa
Sajid Akbar and the Lost Boys
Detonation
Level 9
Advaita
Anterior
Caesar’s Palace
Scribe
Motherjane
Cyanide
Split
Something Relevant
Demonic Resurrection
Mohit Chauhan

References 

Prospect Music Division
Hindustan Times article

External links
Official Website
Contemporary classical music festivals
Classical music festivals in India
Music festivals in India
2008 in music
New Delhi
Music festivals established in 2008